Ulundi, also known as Mahlabathini, is a town in the Zululand District Municipality. At one time the capital of Zulu Kingdom in South Africa and later the capital of the Bantustan of KwaZulu, Ulundi now lies in KwaZulu-Natal Province (of which, from 1994 to 2004, it alternated with Pietermaritzburg as the provincial capital). The town now includes Ulundi Airport, a three-star hotel, and some museums amongst its sights. In the 2001 Census, the population of the town was recorded as 18,420.

History
When Cetshwayo became king of the Zulus on 1 September 1873, he created, as was customary, a new capital for the nation, naming it "Ulundi" ("The high place"). On 4 July 1879, in the Battle of Ulundi (the final battle of the Anglo-Zulu War), the British Army captured the royal kraal and razed it to the ground.

Nearby is Ondini, where King Mpande, Cetshwayo's father, had his kraal.  A large Zulu hut now is on the site.

Climate
Köppen-Geiger climate classification system classifies its climate as humid subtropical (Cfa). It is rainier in the warmer months.

References

External links
Battles around Ulundi

Populated places in the Ulundi Local Municipality
Populated places established in 1873